Ismaël Gace (born September 19, 1986) is a French football defender who currently plays for SAS Épinal.

Career 
Gace began his career at French Ligue 1 capital club Paris Saint-Germain as part of their youth set-up. In 2002, he moved to Côte d'Azur based club OGC Nice, where he was contracted until 2012. On 16 January 2009, he joined Rodez AF on loan. On 28 July 2011, he joined the Ligue 2 side US Boulogne.

References

External links 

Profile on World Soccer Stats
Profile on Eurosport
Profile on Football Lineups

1986 births
Living people
Sportspeople from Saint-Germain-en-Laye
Association football fullbacks
French footballers
Paris Saint-Germain F.C. players
OGC Nice players
Rodez AF players
US Boulogne players
Ligue 1 players
Ligue 2 players
Footballers from Yvelines